Soka Afrika is a 2011 documentary film on the subject of African football trafficking.

The film is directed by Suridh Hassan, co-directed by Ryo Sanada (both of The SRK) and produced by Simon Laub and Sam Potter (both of Masnomis Ltd).

The film has been shown in festivals worldwide. It has also been released as a DVD. It is 77 minutes long.

Sam Potter, the executive producer was interviewed in relation to the Raindance Film Festival, explains that the film is capturing the efforts that people go to in order to 'get out of Africa', using Football as a microcosm.

Soka Afrika was later followed up by documentary film Foul Play also by director Suridh Hassan of Studio Rarekind (theSRK) which looks at match-fixing across Asia.

References

External links
http://www.sokaafrika.com

2011 films